Mylothris trimenia, the Trimen's dotted border, is a butterfly of the family Pieridae. It is found in South Africa, on the wet side of the Winterberg escarpment from the East Cape to the coast. It is also found in KwaZulu-Natal and the Limpopo Province.

Adults are on wing year-round in warmer areas, with a peak from October to April. In cooler areas it is only on the wing from October to April.

The larvae feed on Tapinanthus - T. oleifolius and T. kraussianus. The eggs are laid in clusters on the undersides of the leaves of the host plant.  They are watery white with a coating of a glutinous, yellow substance. The larvae emerge from the side of the egg and eat the discarded shell. They are gregarious and usually sit side by side on the leaves of the food plant. There are five larval instars. Mature larvae drop to the ground on silken threads and scatter to various places to pupate.

References

Seitz, A. Die Gross-Schmetterlinge der Erde 13: Die Afrikanischen Tagfalter. Plate XIII 11

Pierini
Butterflies described in 1869
Endemic butterflies of South Africa
Taxa named by Arthur Gardiner Butler